Hypatia (minor planet designation: 238 Hypatia) is a very large main-belt asteroid that was discovered by Russian astronomer Viktor Knorre on July 1, 1884, in Berlin. It was the third of his four asteroid discoveries. The name was given in honour of philosopher Hypatia of Alexandria. Based upon the spectrum, it is classified as a C-type asteroid and is probably composed of primitive carbonaceous material. Like many asteroids of this type, its surface is very dark in colour.

Photometric observations of this asteroid at the European Southern Observatory in 1981 gave a light curve with a period of 8.9 ± 0.1 hours and a brightness variation of 0.12 in magnitude. Stellar occultation events were observed for this asteroid during 2001 and 2005. The resulting chords provided cross-section diameter estimates of 146.5 and 145.3 km, respectively.

References

External links
The Asteroid Orbital Elements Database
Minor Planet Discovery Circumstances
Asteroid Lightcurve Data File
 

Background asteroids
Hypatia
Hypatia
C-type asteroids (Tholen)
Ch-type asteroids (SMASS)
18840701